Joseph Leon Lignières was a French-Argentinian veterinarian and bacteriologist, the binomial authority for the Salmonella genus of bacteria. Lignières was born on 26 March 1868 in Saint-Mihiel, Meuse, France.

Authority abbreviation

References

1868 births
1933 deaths
French bacteriologists